Moissac-Vallée-Française is a commune in the Lozère département in southern France.

See also
Communes of the Lozère department

References

Moissacvalleefrancaise